Dublin North-Central was a parliamentary constituency represented in Dáil Éireann, the lower house of the Irish parliament or Oireachtas, from 1948 to 2016. The method of election was proportional representation by means of the single transferable vote (PR-STV).

History and boundaries
It varied between 3 and 4 seats from its creation in 1948. It was located on the northside of Dublin city. It was subsumed into the new Dublin Bay North constituency at the 2016 general election.

The constituency's most high-profile TD was Charles Haughey, Taoiseach from 1979 to 1981, in 1982, and from 1987 to 1992. Haughey won the first seat in the constituency at every election from 1981 until his retirement in 1992. At that election, his son Seán Haughey succeeded him in the constituency.

TDs

Elections

2011 general election

2007 general election

2002 general election

1997 general election

1992 general election

1989 general election

1987 general election

November 1982 general election

February 1982 general election

1981 general election

1977 general election

1973 general election

1969 general election

1965 general election

1961 general election

1957 by-election
Following the death of Fianna Fáil TD Colm Gallagher, a by-election was held on 14 November 1957. The seat was won by Independent candidate Frank Sherwin.

1957 general election

1954 general election

1951 general election

1948 general election

See also
Dáil constituencies
Politics of the Republic of Ireland
Historic Dáil constituencies
Elections in the Republic of Ireland

References

External links
Oireachtas Members Database
 Dublin Historic Maps: Parliamentary & Dáil Constituencies 1780–1969 (a work in progress.)
 Dublin Historic Maps: Some Dublin and Kingstown Wards, Between 1780 and 1954

Dáil constituencies in County Dublin (historic)
1948 establishments in Ireland
Constituencies established in 1948
2016 disestablishments in Ireland
Constituencies disestablished in 2016